Glyne Samuel Hyvestra Murray is a Barbadian politician, businessman and diplomat. He was the former minister of state in the cabinet of Prime Minister Owen Arthur. He was the former Barbadian ambassador to Canada.

References 

Living people
Barbadian politicians
Barbadian diplomats
Government ministers of Barbados
Ambassadors of Barbados to Canada
Year of birth missing (living people)